Penns is an unincorporated community in Lowndes County, Mississippi.

According to the United States Geological Survey, variant names are Penns Station and Penn.

References

Unincorporated communities in Lowndes County, Mississippi
Unincorporated communities in Mississippi